Ahmet Emin Yalman (1888–19 December 1972) was a Turkish journalist, author and professor. He was a liberal and opposed the spread of the Nazi ideology in his home country.

Early life and education
Ahmet Emin Yalman was born into a Dönmeh family in 1888 in Thessaloniki, which at that time was part of the Ottoman Empire. His early education was diverse and he attended several schools in Thessaloniki, amongst them a primary school with Sabbatean influences, then the military middle school where his father Osman Tefviq Bey was the teacher of calligraphy and following some difficulties he ran into with his teachers, his father decided to enroll him into the German school in Selanik. In 1903, as his father was employed in Ottoman Press directorate in Constantinople (present-day Istanbul), he attended the German school in Beyoğlu where he learned German and English. Following his graduation began to work as a translator for the newspaper Sabah as well as the Ottoman Government. He also attempted to study law at the Darülfünun in Istanbul, but was not able to finish the school. From 1911 onwards he studied political sciences at the Columbia University, from where he earned a Ph.D in 1914.

Professional career
After he returned to Istanbul he worked with Ziya Gökalp at the Darülfünun, and was a journalist for the newspaper Tanin. For Tanin he covered the World War I from the various battle fronts in which the German Empire was involved in. Following his return to Istanbul, he established the Vakit in October 1917.

In 1919, due to his opposition to the government of Damat Ferid Pasha was exiled for three months to Kutahya, by the order of the Sultan Mehmet VI. In 1920 he was exiled again, this time as a supporter of the Ottoman Committee of Union and Progress (CUP) by the British Occupation forces. He was released in 1921 and joined the forces of the Ankara government around Mustafa Kemal Atatürk. Atatürk sent him to cover the several battle fronts in Turkish War of independence. In 1923, he founded the newspaper Vatan and following this he became a fierce critic of Kemalist Government, especially of Prime Minister İsmet İnönü who demanded the imposition of the law for the restoration of order during the Sheikh Said rebellion. Due to this opposition, he had to stand trial in front of the Independence Tribunals and was banned from journalistic activities until 1936. During this period he involved in business and became a representative of various American companies. When he was allowed to resume his journalistic activities he worked for the Tan newspaper.

In 1940 he was able to re-publish the Vatan. In 1952, a nationalist student attempted to murder him, but the assault failed and the student was sentenced to twenty years in prison. In the end of the Menderes era, he was imprisoned and condemned to over one-year imprisonment, but was released after the military coup of 1960. He died on the 19 December 1972 in Istanbul.

Work and awards
Yalman was the founder, and for many years the editor, of the influential Turkish nationalist newspaper Vatan. He was also one of the founders of the Liberal International in 1947 and the International Press Institute in 1950.

He published three books in English, one in German, and more than ten in Turkish, including a four volume autobiography. Titles include The Development of Modern Turkey as Measured by Its Press (1914), An Experiment in Clean Journalism (1950), Turkey In My Time (1956) and Turkey in the World War (1930).

Awards he received included the Golden Pen of Freedom of the International Federation of Newspaper Publishers in 1961 and The Gold Medal of the British Institute of Journalists.

References

External links
Google inauthor search for Ahmet Emin Yalman

1888 births
1972 deaths
Sabbateans
20th-century journalists from the Ottoman Empire
Writers from Thessaloniki
20th-century Turkish journalists
Turkish newspaper publishers (people)
Deutsche Schule Istanbul alumni
Istanbul University Faculty of Law alumni
Columbia Graduate School of Arts and Sciences alumni
Academic staff of Istanbul University
Malta exiles
Turkish non-fiction writers
Turkish people of Jewish descent
20th-century writers from the Ottoman Empire
20th-century Turkish businesspeople
20th-century newspaper founders